P. albiflora may refer to:

Paeonia albiflora, a synonym of Paeonia lactiflora
Polytaenia albiflora, a flowering plant endemic to the Edwards Plateau